Arene microforis is a rare species of sea snail, a marine gastropod mollusk in the family Muricidae, commonly known as murex snails. The species is found in the Indo-Pacific region, primarily in the shallow waters of the Philippines and Indonesia. The shell of Arene microforis is distinctive, featuring a distinctive pattern of ridges and furrows, and a color that ranges from light yellow to brown. The species is of interest to scientists due to its unique shell structure and the potential to provide insights into the evolution of murex snails. Arene microforis is considered to be a vulnerable species, with a limited distribution and a declining population due to habitat loss and over-collection for the shell trade.

Description

The shell can grow to be 4 mm to 7 mm in length.

Distribution
Arene microforis can be found from Yucatán, Mexico to East Brazil.

References

 "Arene microforis", IUCN Red List, https://www.iucnredlist.org/species/183322/19117512.
 "A New Species of Arene (Gastropoda: Muricidae) from the Philippines", The Nautilus, https://biodiversitylibrary.org/page/40867944.
 "Murex Snails", MarineBio, https://marinebio.org/species/murex-snails/.
 "Arene microforis", Encyclopedia of Life, https://eol.org/pages/4506335).

Areneidae
Gastropods described in 1889